Two Mile Hill is an area  away from Bridgetown, in Saint Michael Parish, Barbados. The Two Mile Hill area was historically one of the railway stations on the island of Barbados. The Barbados Railway was a part of the island's colonial distribution network for the sugar cane industry while the country was under the control of Britain. The location no longer has a railway and is now instead known more for its Sherbourne Conference Centre.

Populated places in Barbados
Saint Michael, Barbados